Hammu ibn Abd al-Haqq ibn Rahhu was a Marinid prince who served as shaykh al-ghuzat (chief of the Volunteers of the Faith) in the Nasrid Emirate of Granada during the reigns of Muhammad III and Nasr. 

He unsuccessfully rebelled against the Marinid Sultan Abu al-Rabi Sulayman in North Africa. Like many dissident princes, he was exiled to Granada to join the "Volunteers of the Faith", a military corps made up of North Africans who fought to defend Muslims in the Iberian Peninsula. Under Muhammad III, he commanded the troops that captured Bedmar from Castile in April 1302, two weeks after the Sultan's accession. When another Marinid prince Uthman ibn Abi al-Ula entered the Nasrid service, he was given command of the Volunteers in Malaga and the western territories, while Hammu ibn al-Haqq kept the command in Granada. He kept the post after Muhammad III was deposed and replaced by his brother Nasr. When a rebellion broke out against Nasr in favor of his nephew Ismail I, Hammu remained loyal while Uthman sided with Ismail. The rebellion was ultimately successful, Nasr abdicated in 1314 while Hammu lost his post and followed Nasr to exile in Guadix.

Footnotes

Sources 
 
 

People from the Emirate of Granada
Marinid dynasty
14th-century Berber people
14th-century Moroccan people
14th-century people from al-Andalus
People of the Reconquista
Rebels of the medieval Islamic world